The Victory Theatre is a 1,950 seat venue in Evansville, Indiana. It is home to the Evansville Philharmonic Orchestra and also hosts local ballet and modern dance companies, theatre companies, and touring productions.

Opened on June 16, 1921 and originally seating 2,500 patrons, the theater was part of the Sonntag Hotel – Victory Theater complex that was organized by Marcus Sonntag and associates who were stockholders in the American Trust and Savings Bank across Sixth Street from the theater. Along with Frederick H. Gruneberg, St., President of the Consolidated Theaters Corporation, Sonntag and his associates contracted with Hoffman Construction Company to build the theater. It was air conditioned with commercial ice.

The Victory featured a daily program of four vaudeville acts, a movie, a comedy routine, organ music and a ten-piece orchestra. In 1926 the Victory was leased to Loews Theatres as a movie chain and was renamed Loew's Victory. In 1928 Loew's featured Evansville's first "talking picture," an epic titled "Tenderloin." Later that year, "The Jazz Singer," featuring Al Jolson, became the first stand-alone talkie shown in the city. The Loews's Victory Theatre closed in 1971. As the independent Victory Theatre it was divided into a triplex, but was closed in 1979. The theater was restored to its former glory and reopened in 1998 after a $15 million renovation.

The Victory was designed by architect John Pridmore of Chicago. The exterior is in the restrained style characteristic of commercial buildings of the era, but the auditorium is more ornate. In 1982 it was added to the National Register of Historic Places.

It is owned by the City of Evansville and is co-managed with The Ford Center by VenuWorks.

References

External links

Official website
Historic Evansville; Victory Theater/Hotel Sonntag
Victory Theater and Hotel Sonntag, Historic Landmarks Foundation of Indiana, National Register of Historic Places (1983)

Buildings and structures in Evansville, Indiana
Culture of Evansville, Indiana
Cinemas and movie theaters in Indiana
Theatres in Indiana
Music venues in Indiana
Tourist attractions in Evansville, Indiana
Loew's Theatres buildings and structures
Theatres on the National Register of Historic Places in Indiana
Hotel buildings on the National Register of Historic Places in Indiana
National Register of Historic Places in Evansville, Indiana